The War of the Tongs is a 1917 American silent drama film directed by H.O. Davis.

Cast
 Tom Hing as Chin Ting, wealthy Tong leader
 Hoo Ching asLee Hoy
 Lee Gow as Wong Wing, tea merchant employee
 Lin Neong as Suey Lee

References

Bibliography
 Robert B. Connelly. The Silents: Silent Feature Films, 1910-36, Volume 40, Issue 2. December Press, 1998.

External links
 

1917 films
1917 drama films
1910s English-language films
American silent feature films
Silent American drama films
American black-and-white films
Universal Pictures films
1910s American films